Ireland Will be Free is a 1920 Australian documentary film. It was about the 1920 St Patrick's Day Parade in Melbourne.

Production
Daniel Mannix was behind the making of the film to show his support for an Irish Free State. John Wren was also involved.

A restored and remastered version was exhibited by the State Library of Victoria in 2016.

References

1920 films
Documentary films about Ireland
Australian documentary films
1920 documentary films
Films shot in Melbourne
Irish-Australian culture
Australian silent feature films
Australian black-and-white films
Australian political films